Megachile strigata is a species of bee in the family Megachilidae. It was described by Rebmann in 1904.

References

Strigata
Insects described in 1904